Fredrik Johannes Ultvedt (born 9 April 1961 in Stockholm) is a Swedish actor, best known for his role as Jens Loftegård in the Beck series.

Filmography
As actor:
Honongsvargar (1990)
Storstad (1990)
Tre terminer (1991 - TV series)
Snoken (1993 - TV series)
NileCity 105,6 (1993 - TV series)
Percy tårar (1996 - TV series)
Beck – Lockpojken (1997)
Beck – Mannen med ikonerna (1997)
Beck – Pensionat Pärlan (1997)
Beck – Spår i mörker (1997)
Selma & Johanna – en roadmovie (1997)
Beck – The Money Man (1998)
Beck – Monstret (1998)
Beck – Vita nätter (1998)
Beck – Öga för öga (1998)
OP7 (1998 TV series)
Tre Kronor (1999 TV series)
Det grovmaskiga nätet (2000)

As director:
Vänner och fiender (1996 - TV series)

References

External links

1961 births
Living people
Male actors from Stockholm